Bludenz railway station serves the city of Bludenz, in the Bludenz district of the Austrian federal state of Vorarlberg.  Opened in 1872, it forms the junction between the Arlberg railway and the Vorarlberg railway.

The station is also a terminus of the Bludenz–Schruns railway.  It is owned and operated by the Austrian Federal Railways (ÖBB).

Location
Bludenz railway station is situated in Bahnhofplatz, right in the heart of the city, on the east bank of the Ill river.  Like the river, the lines passing through the station run in a north west - south easterly direction at this point.

The station building is on the northeastern side of the lines, facing the inner city.  On the other, southwestern, side of the lines is the goods yard.

Features

Station building
The old station building is laid out in a plan of three axes. The three key parts of the building are arranged with eaves facing each other, and are connected by a structure running parallel to the running line. Extending along this structure, on the forecourt side, is a recently constructed large canopy.

Inside the building, apart from the typical station facilities, are offices and a canteen for railway workers.

Station yard
Bludenz has unusually extensive railway facilities. The station yard covers an area of approximately 200 ha. For passenger traffic, there are a main platform and two other platforms with a total of four tracks. In addition, there are two stub sidings one at the northwest end of the yard, and the other at the southeast ends.  In the centre of the yard there is a through track.

In the northwest corner, since the introduction of a second running line completed from Bregenz only in 1995, there are several tracks for stabling locomotives and railcars.  South of that point there is a new motive power depot with ten tracks.

Eight sidings are provided for goods traffic.

Renovations
After twelve years of discussion, the City of Bludenz decided on 26 September 2008 that the station area would be renovated. One effect of the renovations would be that individual motorised traffic near the station would largely disappear.  Apart from the station forecourt, the barracks room to its north would be modified, and the workers' room rebuilt. The project was expected to be completed in 2011.

See also

History of rail transport in Austria
Rail transport in Austria

References

Notes

Further reading

External links 

This article is based upon a translation of the German language version as at October 2011.

Railway stations in Vorarlberg
Railway stations opened in 1872
Vorarlberg S-Bahn stations